The São Gonçalo Monopteros is an 18th-century monopteros and a cultural heritage monument in Penas Róias, Mogadouro, Portugal. The Baroque-style structure built to house the image of Gonçalo de Amarante is a rare example of this type of architecture in Portugal.

It is a circular plan construction, with six  Solomonic columns based on plinths and topped by Ionian capitals. A balustrade is raised above the entablature and the cover is made by a semi-spherical dome.

The monopter was built in the same place where a hermitage, built in 1571, once dedicated to São Gonçalo existed. In 1720, this chapel was already quite ruined and the chancel would be used as a place for collecting cattle. It was around that time that the monopter was erected to house the image of the saint.

References

Baroque architecture in Portugal
18th-century architecture